Tennessee is one of the 50 states of the United States. What is now Tennessee was initially part of North Carolina, and later part of the Southwest Territory. It was admitted to the Union on June 1, 1796, as the 16th state. Tennessee would earn the nickname "The Volunteer State" during the War of 1812, when many Tennesseans would step in to help with the war effort. Especially during the Americans victory at the Battle of New Orleans in 1815. The nickname would become even more applicable during the Mexican–American War in 1846, after the Secretary of War asked the state for 2,800 soldiers, and Tennessee sent over 30,000 volunteers.

Tennessee was the last state to formally leave the Union and join the Confederacy at the outbreak of the American Civil War in 1861. With Nashville occupied by Union forces from 1862, it was the first state to be readmitted to the Union at the end of the war. During the Civil War, Tennessee would furnish the second most soldiers for the Confederate Army, behind Virginia. Tennessee would also supply more units of soldiers for the Union Army than any other state within the Confederacy, with East Tennessee being a Unionist stronghold. During the Reconstruction era, the state had competitive party politics, but a Democratic takeover in the late 1880s resulted in passage of disenfranchisement laws that excluded most blacks and many poor whites from voting, with the exception of Memphis. This sharply reduced competition in politics in the state until after passage of civil rights legislation in the mid-20th century.

During the early 20th century, Tennessee would transition from an agrarian economy based on tobacco and cotton, to a more diversified economy. This was aided in part by massive federal investment in the Tennessee Valley Authority created by Franklin D. Roosevelt's New Deal, helping the TVA become the nation's largest public utility provider. The huge electricity supply made possible the establishment of the city of Oak Ridge to house the Manhattan Project's uranium enrichment facilities, helping to build the world's first atomic bombs. In 2016, the element tennessine was named for the state, largely in recognition of the roles played by Oak Ridge, Vanderbilt University, and the University of Tennessee in the element's discovery.

Prehistory

Paleo-Indians are believed to have hunted and camped in what is now Tennessee as early as 12,000 years ago. Along with projectile points common for this period, archaeologists in Williamson County have uncovered a 12,000-year-old mastodon skeleton with cut marks typical of prehistoric hunters.

The most prominent known Archaic period (c. 8000 – 1000 BC) site in Tennessee is the Icehouse Bottom site located just south of Fort Loudoun in Monroe County. Excavations at Icehouse Bottom in the early 1970s uncovered evidence of human habitation dating to as early as 7,500 BC. Other archaic sites include Rose Island, located a few miles downstream from Icehouse Bottom, and the Eva site in Benton County. The Archaic peoples first domesticated dogs and created the first villages in the state, but were largely hunter-gatherers confined to smaller territories than their predecessors.

Tennessee is home to two major Woodland period (1000 BC – 1000 AD) sites: the Pinson Mounds in Madison County and the Old Stone Fort in Coffee County, both built c. 1–500 AD. The Pinson Mounds are the largest Middle Woodland site in the Southeastern United States, consisting of at least 12 mounds and a geometric earthen enclosure. The Old Stone Fort is a large ceremonial structure with a complex entrance way, situated on what was once a relatively inaccessible peninsula.

Mississippian (c. 1000 – 1600) villages are found along the banks of most of the major rivers in Tennessee. The most well-known of these sites include Chucalissa near Memphis; Mound Bottom in Cheatham County; Shiloh Mounds in Hardin County; and the Toqua site in Monroe County. Excavations at the McMahan Mound Site in Sevier County and more recently at Townsend in Blount County have uncovered the remnants of palisaded villages dating to 1200.

European exploration and settlement

Early Spanish and French exploration

In the 16th century, three Spanish expeditions passed through what is now Tennessee. The Hernando de Soto expedition entered the Tennessee Valley via the Nolichucky River in June 1540, rested for several weeks at the village of Chiaha (near the modern Douglas Dam), and proceeded southward to the Coosa chiefdom in northern Georgia. De Soto spent the winter of 1540-41 in camp on Pontotoc Ridge in extreme northern Mississippi. He may have entered Tennessee and went west to the Mississippi at or near present-day Memphis. In 1559, the expedition of Tristán de Luna, which was resting at Coosa, entered the Chattanooga area to help the Coosa chief subdue a rebellious tribe known as the Napochies. In 1567, the Pardo expedition entered the Tennessee Valley via the French Broad River, rested for several days at Chiaha, and followed a trail to the upper Little Tennessee River before being forced to turn back. At Chiaha, one of Pardo's subordinates, Hernando Moyano de Morales, established a short-lived fort called San Pedro. It, along with five other Spanish forts across the region, was destroyed by natives in 1569, thereby opening the area to other European colonization.

Chronicles of the Spanish explorers provide the earliest written accounts regarding the Tennessee Valley's 16th-century inhabitants. Most of the valley, including Chiaha, was part of the Coosa chiefdom's regional sphere of influence. Inhabitants spoke a dialect of the Muskogean language, and lived in complex agrarian communities centered around fortified villages. Cherokee-speaking people lived in the remote reaches of the Appalachian Mountains, and may have been at war with the Muskogean inhabitants in the valley. The village of Tali, visited by De Soto in 1540, is believed to be the Mississippian-period village excavated at the Toqua site in the 1970s. The villages of Chalahume and Satapo, visited by Pardo in 1567, were likely predecessors (and namesakes for) the later Cherokee villages of Chilhowee and Citico, which were located near the modern Chilhowee Dam.

As of the 17th century, Tennessee was the middle ground for several different native peoples. Along the Mississippi River was the Chickasaw & Choctaw peoples, and inland of them were the Coushatta—all three were part of the Muskogean language family. Before European contact, they were supposedly all a loose collection of Mississippian culture city-states with their own leaders, but upon contact with Europeans, they merged into larger nations, spread out and adopted a European lifestyle, earning many of them the title of the "Civilized Tribes." During the height of the Mississippians, hundreds of walled cities extended throughout the American south from Louisiana to the east coast, up the Mississippi into Wisconsin & a few fringe cities along larger rivers on the Great Plains. They had complex society & agriculture. They did not build with stone, but made plenty of examples of sculpture work in clay, stone & copper. Most of what remains of these cities, however, are large, pyramidal, earthen hills (upon which chiefs & upper-classmen would build their homes) and artful burial mounds. These people did not develop the Mississippian culture, however, but adopted it from the Caddo people west of the Mississippi River.

To the east were the Yuchi & Iroquoian Cherokee, divided along the Tennessee River. In the north-central region of the state were the Algonquian Cisca. They later moved northeast and merged with the Shawnee, but were briefly replaced with a second native nation known as the Maumee, or Mascouten which were driven south during the Beaver Wars (1640-1680) from southern Michigan. They later merged with the Miami of Indiana & were, once again, replaced by the Shawnee. The Shawnee controlled most of the Ohio River Region until the Shawnee Wars (1811-1813).

In 1673, British fur trader Abraham Wood sent an expedition led by James Needham and Gabriel Arthur from Fort Henry in the Colony of Virginia into Overhill Cherokee territory in modern-day northeastern Tennessee. Needham was killed during the expedition and Arthur was taken prisoner for more than a year. That same year, a French expedition led by missionary Jacques Marquette and trader Louis Jolliet explored the Mississippi River and became the first Europeans to map the Mississippi Valley.

French explorers and traders, led by Robert de La Salle, entered the region in 1682 at Fort Prudhomme. France briefly (1739–1740) established a presence at Fort Assumption during the Chickasaw Wars. In 1714, a group of French traders under Charles Charleville's command established a settlement at the present location of downtown Nashville near the Cumberland River, which became known as French Lick. These settlers quickly established an extensive fur trading network with the local Native Americans, but by the 1740s the settlement had largely been abandoned. In 1739, the French constructed Fort Assumption under Jean-Baptiste Le Moyne de Bienville on the Mississippi River at the present-day location of Memphis, which they used as a base against the Chickasaw during the 1739 Campaign of the Chickasaw Wars. It was abandoned the next year after the Chickasaw took hostage French troops stationed at the fort.

The Cherokee eventually moved south from the area now called Virginia. As European colonists spread into the area, the native populations were forcibly displaced to the south and west, including the Muscogee, Yuchi, Chickasaw and Choctaw peoples. Then, from 1838 to 1839, the US government forced the Cherokee to leave the eastern United States. Nearly 17,000 Cherokee were forced to march from eastern Tennessee to the Indian Territory west of the Arkansas Territory. This came to be known as the Trail of Tears, as an estimated 4,000 Cherokee died along the way. In the Cherokee language, the event is called Nunna daul Isunyi—"The Trail Where We Cried".

Early British exploration and settlement
In the 1750s and 1760s, longhunters from Virginia explored much of East and Middle Tennessee. In 1756, British soldiers from the Colony of South Carolina built Fort Loudoun near present-day Vonore, the first British settlement in what is now Tennessee. Fort Loudoun was the westernmost British outpost to that date, and was designed by John William Gerard de Brahm and constructed by forces under Captain Raymond Demeré. Shortly after its completion, Demeré relinquished command of the fort to his brother, Captain Paul Demeré. Hostilities erupted between the British and the Overhill Cherokees into an armed conflict that became known as the Anglo-Cherokee War, and a siege of the fort ended with its surrender in 1760. The next morning, Paul Demeré and a number of his troops were killed in an ambush nearby, and most of the rest of the garrison was taken prisoner. After the end of the French and Indian War, Britain issued the Royal Proclamation of 1763, which forbade settlements west of the Appalachian Mountains in an effort to mitigate conflicts with the Natives. Despite this proclamation, migration across the mountains continued, and the first permanent European settlers began arriving in the northeastern part of the state in the late 1760s. William Bean, a longhunter who settled in a log cabin near present-day Johnson City in 1769, is traditionally accepted as the first permanent European American settler in Tennessee. Most 18th-century settlers were English or of primarily English descent, but nearly 20% of them were Scotch-Irish.

Watauga Association

During 1772, the Watauga Association met with, and leased lands belonging to, the Cherokee at Sycamore Shoals (in the present day area of Elizabethton, Tennessee). In 1775, Sycamore Shoals was the site of the Transylvania purchase, conducted between the Cherokee and North Carolina land baron, Richard Henderson.

The Treaty of Sycamore Shoals, more popularly referred to as the Transylvania Purchase (after Henderson's Transylvania Company, which had raised money for the endeavor), consisted of two parts. The first, known as the "Path Grant Deed", regarded the Transylvania Company's purchase of lands in southwest Virginia (including parts of what is now West Virginia) and northeastern Tennessee. The Transylvania Company paid for the land with 10,000 pounds sterling of trade goods. After the treaty was signed, frontier explorer Daniel Boone came northward to blaze the Wilderness Road, connecting the Transylvania Purchase lands with the Holston and Watauga settlements.

Both the lease and the sale were considered illegal by the Crown Government, as well as by the warring Cherokee faction known as the Chickamauga, led by the war-chief, Dragging Canoe. The Chickamauga violently contested the westward expansion by European settlers across Tennessee throughout the Cherokee–American wars (1776–1794).

In April 1775, the Watauga Association was reorganized as the "Washington District," allied with the colonies that were declaring independence from Great Britain. The Washington District annexation petition was first rejected by Virginia in the spring of 1776, but a similar annexation petition presented by the district to the North Carolina legislature was approved in November 1776.

Government under North Carolina

In the days before statehood, Tennesseans struggled to gain a political voice and suffered for lack of the protection afforded by organized government. Six counties—Washington, Sullivan, and Greene in East Tennessee; and Davidson, Sumner, and Tennessee County in Middle Tennessee—had been formed as western counties of North Carolina between 1777 and 1788.

In 1780, the newly formed Cumberland Association, under the Cumberland Compact, established Fort Nashborough on the Cumberland River, opening up a second frontier of settlement within present-day Tennessee. The Cumberland River settlements were separated from those in the east by a substantial enclave of Cherokee territory that was not formally acquired from them until 1805.

After the American Revolutionary War, North Carolina did not want the trouble and expense of maintaining such distant settlements, embroiled as they were with hostile tribesmen during the Cherokee–American wars, and needing roads, forts, and open waterways. Nor could the far-flung settlers look to the national government; for under the weak, loosely constituted Articles of Confederation, it was a government in name only.

In 1775, Richard Henderson negotiated a series of treaties with the Cherokee to sell the lands of the Watauga settlements at Sycamore Shoals on the banks of the Watauga River in present-day Elizabethton. An agreement to sell land for the Transylvania Colony, which included the territory in modern-day Tennessee north of the Cumberland River, was also signed. Later that year, Daniel Boone, under Henderson's employment, blazed a trail from Fort Chiswell in Virginia through the Cumberland Gap, which became part of the Wilderness Road, a major thoroughfare for settlers into Tennessee and Kentucky.

The first reported permanent settlement in Tennessee, Bean Station, was established in 1776, but was explored by pioneers Daniel Boone and William Bean one year prior on a longhunting excursion. The duo first observed Bean Station after crossing the gap at Clinch Mountain along a southern expansion of the Wilderness Road from the Cumberland Gap, one of the main thoroughfares into Tennessee. After fighting in the American Revolutionary War one year later, Bean was awarded  in the area he previously surveyed for settlement during his excursion with Boone. Bean would later construct a four-room cabin at this site, which served as his family's permanent home, and as an inn for prospective settlers, fur traders, and longhunters, thus establishing the first reported permanent settlement in Tennessee. The settlement was situated at the intersection of the Wilderness Road, that roughly followed what is present-day U.S. Route 25E, and the Great Indian Warpath, an east–west pathway that roughly followed what is now U.S. Route 11W. This heavily trafficked crossroads location made Bean Station an important stopover between Washington, D.C. and New Orleans for early American travelers entering Tennessee, with taverns and inns operating by the 1800s.

State of Franklin

The westerners' two main demands—protection from the Indians and the right to navigate the Mississippi River—went mainly unheeded during the 1780s. North Carolina's insensitivity led frustrated East Tennesseans in 1784 to form the breakaway State of Franklin.

John Sevier was named governor, and the fledgling state began operating as an independent, though unrecognized, government. At the same time, leaders of the Cumberland settlements made overtures for an alliance with Spain, which controlled the lower Mississippi River and was held responsible for inciting the Indian raids. In drawing up the Watauga and Cumberland Compacts, early Tennesseans had already exercised some of the rights of self-government and were showing signs of a willingness to take political matters into their own hands.

Such stirrings of independence caught the attention of North Carolina, which began to reassert control over its western counties. These policies and internal divisions among East Tennesseans doomed the short-lived State of Franklin, which passed out of existence by early 1789.

Southwest Territory

When North Carolina ratified the Constitution of the United States in 1789, it also ceded its western lands, the "Tennessee country", to the Federal government. North Carolina had used these lands as a means of rewarding its Revolutionary War soldiers. In the Cession Act of 1789, it reserved the right to satisfy further land claims in Tennessee.

Congress designated the area as the "Territory of the United States South of the River Ohio", more commonly known as the Southwest Territory. The territory was divided into three districts—two for East Tennessee and one for the Mero District on the Cumberland—each with its own courts, militia and officeholders. President George Washington appointed William Blount, a prominent North Carolinian politician with extensive holdings in the western lands, territorial governor.

Admission to the Union

In 1795, a territorial census revealed a sufficient population for statehood. A referendum showed a three-to-one majority in favor of joining the Union. Governor Blount called for a constitutional convention to meet in Knoxville, where delegates from all the counties drew up a model state constitution and democratic bill of rights.

The voters chose Sevier as governor. The newly elected legislature voted for Blount and William Cocke as Senators, and Andrew Jackson as Congressman.

Tennessee leaders thereby converted the territory into a new state, with organized government and constitution, before applying to Congress for admission. Since the Southwest Territory was the first Federal territory to present itself for admission to the Union, there was some uncertainty about how to proceed, and Congress was divided on the issue.

Nonetheless, in a close vote on June 1, 1796, Congress approved the admission of Tennessee as the sixteenth state of the Union. They drew its borders by extending the northern and southern borders of North Carolina, with a few deviations, to the Mississippi River, Tennessee's western boundary.

Jacksonian America (1815–1841)

In the early years of settlement, planters brought African slaves with them from Kentucky and Virginia. These slaves were first concentrated in Middle Tennessee, where planters developed mixed crops and bred high-quality horses and cattle, as they did in the Inner Bluegrass region of Kentucky. East Tennessee had more subsistence farmers and few slaveholders.

During the early years of state formation, there was support for emancipation. At the constitutional convention of 1796, "free negroes" were given the right to vote if they met residency and property requirements. Efforts to abolish slavery were defeated at this convention and again at the convention of 1834. The convention of 1834 also marked the state's retraction of suffrage for most freed slaves.

By 1830 the number of African Americans had increased from less than 4,000 at the beginning of the century to 146,158. This was chiefly related to the invention of the cotton gin in 1793 and the development of large plantations and transportation of numerous enslaved people to the Cotton Belt in West Tennessee, in the area of the Mississippi River.

Antebellum years (1841–1861)
By 1860 the slave population had nearly doubled to 283,019, with only 7,300 free African Americans in the state. While much of the slave population was concentrated in West Tennessee, planters in Middle Tennessee also used enslaved African Americans for labor. According to the 1860 census, African slaves comprised about 25% of the state's population of 1.1 million before the Civil War.

Civil War

Secession

Most Tennesseans initially showed little enthusiasm for breaking away from a nation whose struggles it had shared for so long. There were small exceptions such as Franklin County, which borders Alabama in southern Middle Tennessee; Franklin County formally threatened to secede from Tennessee and join Alabama if Tennessee did not leave the Union. Franklin County withdrew this threat when Tennessee did eventually secede. In 1860, Tennesseans had voted by a slim margin for the Constitutional Unionist John Bell, a native son and moderate who continued to search for a way out of the crisis.

In February 1861, fifty-four percent of the state's voters voted against sending delegates to a secession convention. With the attack on Fort Sumter in April, however, followed by President Abraham Lincoln's call for 75,000 volunteers to coerce the seceded states back into line, public sentiment turned dramatically against the Union.

Historian Daniel Crofts wrote: "Unionists of all descriptions, both those who became Confederates and those who did not, considered the proclamation calling for seventy-five thousand troops 'disastrous.' Having consulted personally with Lincoln in March, Congressman Horace Maynard, the unconditional Unionist and future Republican from East Tennessee, felt assured that the administration would pursue a peaceful policy. Soon after April 15, a dismayed Maynard reported that 'the President's extraordinary proclamation' had unleashed 'a tornado of excitement that seems likely to sweep us all away.'  Men who had 'heretofore been cool, firm and Union loving' had become 'perfectly wild' and were 'aroused to a phrenzy[sic] of passion.' For what purpose, they asked, could such an army be wanted 'but to invade, overrun and subjugate the Southern states.' The growing war spirit in the North further convinced southerners that they would have to 'fight for our hearthstones and the security of home.'

Governor Isham Harris began military mobilization, submitted an ordinance of secession to the General Assembly, and made direct overtures to the Confederate government. In a June 8, 1861, referendum, East Tennessee held firm against separation, while West Tennessee returned an equally heavy majority in favor. The deciding vote came in Middle Tennessee, which went from 51 percent against secession in February to 88 percent in favor in June.

Having ratified by popular vote its connection with the fledgling Confederacy, Tennessee became the last state to officially withdraw from the Union.

Unionism
People in East Tennessee were firmly against Tennessee's move to leave the Union; as were many in other parts of the Union, particularly in historically Whig portions of West Tennessee. This was primarily due to the distribution of slavery throughout the state; Of the state's entire slave population, nearly 40% of West Tennessee and about 20% of Middle Tennessee's were slaves, but in East Tennessee, slaves made up only 8% of the population. The East Tennessee Convention, which met at Knoxville in May 1861 and at Greeneville in June 1861, consisted of 29 East Tennessee counties and one Middle Tennessee county (Scott County) that resolved to secede from Tennessee and form a separate state aligned with the Union. They petitioned the state legislature in Nashville, which denied their request to secede and sent Confederate troops under Felix Zollicoffer to occupy East Tennessee and prevent secession. Many East Tennesseans engaged in guerrilla warfare against state authorities by burning bridges, cutting telegraph wires, and spying. The Union-backing State of Scott was also established at this time and remained a de facto enclave of the United States throughout the war.

Tennessee provided more Union troops than any other Confederate state; more than 51,000 soldiers in total, more than 20,000 of whom were Black. Tennessee also provided 135,000 Confederate troops, the second-highest number after Virginia.

Battles

Many battles were fought in the state – most of them Union victories. Ulysses S. Grant and the United States Navy captured control of the Cumberland and Tennessee Rivers in February 1862 and held off the Confederate counterattack at Shiloh in April of the same year. Capture of Memphis and Nashville gave the Union control of the Western and Middle sections. Control was confirmed at the Battle of Stones River at Murfreesboro in early January 1863.

After Nashville was captured (the first Confederate state capital to fall), Andrew Johnson, an East Tennessean from Greeneville, was appointed military governor of the state by Lincoln. The military government abolished slavery in the state and Union troops occupied much of the state through the end of the war.

The Confederates continued to hold East Tennessee despite the strength of Unionist sentiment there, with the exception of pro-Confederate Sullivan County. The Confederates besieged Chattanooga in early fall 1863 but were driven off by Grant in November. Many of the Confederate defeats can be attributed to the poor strategic vision of General Braxton Bragg, who led the Army of Tennessee from Shiloh to Confederate defeat at Chattanooga.

The last major battles came when the Confederates invaded in November 1864 and were checked at Franklin, then totally destroyed by George Thomas at Nashville in December.

Reconstruction era and Disenfranchisement

After the war, Tennessee adopted the Thirteenth amendment forbidding slave-holding or involuntary servitude on February 22, 1865; ratified the Fourteenth Amendment to the United States Constitution on July 18, 1866; and was the first state readmitted to the Union on July 24, 1866.

Because it had ratified the Fourteenth Amendment, Tennessee was the only state that seceded from the Union that did not have a military governor during Reconstruction. "Proscription" was the policy of disqualifying as many ex-Confederates as possible. In 1865 Tennessee disfranchised upwards of 80,000 ex-Confederates.

There were only two or three African Americans in the Tennessee legislature during Reconstruction, though others served as state and city officers. With increased participation on the Nashville City Council, African Americans then held one-third of the seats. In his race for Congress in 1872, Andrew Johnson addressed African Americans in speaking campaigns in western counties, saying, "If fit and qualified by character and education, no one should deny you the ballot."

In 1870, Southern Democrats regained control of the state legislature, and quickly reversed many of the reforms of the Brownlow administration. In 1889, the Tennessee General Assembly passed four acts of self-described electoral reform that resulted in the disenfranchisement of a significant portion of African American voters as well as many poor white voters. The timing of the legislation resulted from a unique opportunity seized by the Democratic Party to bring an end to what one historian described as the most "consistently competitive political system in the South."  These laws instituted a poll tax, required early voter registration, allowed secret ballots, and required separate ballot boxes for state and federal elections.

In the political campaign of 1888, the Democrats waged a political battle to gain quorum control over both houses of the legislature. With Republicans unable to stall or defeat antiparty measures, the disenfranchising acts sailed through the 1889 general assembly, and Governor Robert L. Taylor signed them into law. Hailed by newspaper editors as the end of black voting, the laws worked as expected, and African American voting declined precipitously in rural and small town Tennessee. Many urban blacks continued to vote until so-called progressive reforms eliminated their political power in the early twentieth century.

Disenfranchising provisions worked against poor whites as well for decades. Tennessee, with the Democratic Party in power in the Middle and Western sections; the Eastern section retained Republican support based on its Unionist leanings before and during the war.

Tennessee Centennial

In 1897, the state celebrated its centennial of statehood (albeit one year late) with a great exposition in Nashville. The Tennessee Centennial Exposition was the ultimate expression of the Gilded Age in the Upper South—a showcase of industrial technology and exotic papier-mâché versions of the world's wonders. The Nashville Parthenon, a full-scale replica of Athens' Parthenon, was built in plaster, wood and brick. Rebuilt of concrete in the 1920s, it remains one of the city's attractions. During its six-month run at Centennial Park, the Exposition drew nearly two million visitors to see its dazzling monuments to the South's recovery. Governor Robert Taylor observed, "Some of them who saw our ruined country thirty years ago will certainly appreciate the fact that we have wrought miracles."

Early 20th century

During the First World War (1914–1918), Tennessee provided the most celebrated American soldier, Alvin C. York, of Fentress County, Tennessee. He was a former conscientious objector who, in October 1918, subdued an entire German machine gun regiment in the Argonne Forest. Besides receiving the Medal of Honor and assorted French decorations, York became a powerful symbol of patriotism in the press and Hollywood film.

Women's rights
Tennessee became the focus of national attention during the campaign for women's voting rights. Like the temperance movement, women's suffrage was an issue with its roots in middle-class reform efforts of the late 19th century.

The organized movement came of age with the founding of the Tennessee Equal Suffrage Association in 1906, which gave the movement at least one national leader in Sue Shelton White from Henderson. There was a determined (and largely female) opposition, championed by the  Chattanooga Times, the Nashville Banner and the Jonesboro Herald and Tribune. To overcome the opposition the Tennessee suffragists were moderate in their tactics and gained limited voting rights before the national question arose.

In August 1920, Governor Albert H. Roberts called a special session of the General Assembly to consider ratification of the Nineteenth Amendment to the U.S. Constitution. Leaders of the rival groups flooded into Nashville to lobby the General Assembly. In a close House vote, the suffrage amendment won passage when an East Tennessee legislator, Harry Burn, switched sides after receiving a telegram from his mother encouraging him to support ratification. On August 9, 1920, during a special session of the Sixty-First General Assembly, Tennessee's vote in favor of ratifying the Nineteenth Amendment, made it the pivotal state in the ratification process. Women immediately made their presence felt by swinging Tennessee to Warren Harding in the 1920 presidential election. It was the first time since 1868 that the state had voted for a Republican presidential candidate.

Scopes Trial
National attention came Tennessee's way during the trial of John T. Scopes, also called the Scopes Trial. In 1925, the General Assembly, as part of a general education bill, passed a law that forbade the teaching of evolution in the public schools. Some local boosters in Dayton, Tennessee concocted a scheme to have Scopes, a high school biology teacher, violate the law and stand trial as a way of drawing publicity and visitors to the town.

Their plan worked all too well, as the Rhea County Courthouse was turned into a circus of national and even international media coverage. Thousands flocked to Dayton to witness the high-powered legal counsels, William Jennings Bryan for the prosecution, and Clarence Darrow for the defense, argue their case.

Tennessee was ridiculed in the northeast and West Coast press as the "Monkey State," even as a wave of revivals defending religious fundamentalism swept the state. The trial was also given the name "Monkey Trial" by the same reporters. The legal outcome of the trial was inconsequential. Scopes was convicted and fined $100, a penalty later rescinded by the state court of appeals. The law itself remained on the books until 1967.

Country music birthplace

At the very time that Tennessee's rural culture was under attack by urban critics, its music found a national audience.

In 1925, WSM, a powerful Nashville radio station, began broadcasting a weekly program of live music which soon was dubbed the "Grand Ole Opry."  Such music came in diverse forms: banjo-and-fiddle string bands from Appalachia; family gospel singing groups; and country vaudeville acts (such as Murfreesboro native Uncle Dave Macon). As of 2014, the longest-running radio program in American history, the Opry used the new technology of radio to tap into a huge market for "old timey" or "hillbilly" music.

Two years after the Opry's opening, in a series of landmark sessions at Bristol, Tennessee, field scout Ralph Peer of the Victor Company recorded Jimmie Rodgers and the Carter Family to produce the first nationally popular rural records. Tennessee emerged as the heartland of traditional country music—home to many of the performers as well as the place from which it was broadcast to the nation.

The Great Depression and TVA
The need to create work for the unemployed during the Great Depression, the desire for rural electrification, and the desire to control the annual spring floods on the Tennessee River drove the federal government's creation of the Tennessee Valley Authority, the nation's largest public utility, in 1933. The TVA affected the lives of nearly all Tennesseans. The agency was created mainly through the persistence of Senator George Norris of Nebraska. Headquartered in Knoxville, it was charged with the task of planning the total development of the Tennessee River Valley. TVA sought to do this by building hydroelectric dams, constructing 20 between 1933 and 1951, as well as electricity-producing coal-fired power plants.

Inexpensive and abundant electrical power was the main benefit the TVA brought to Tennessee, particularly to rural areas that previously did not have electrical service. TVA brought electricity to about 60,000 farm households across the state. By 1945, TVA was the largest electrical utility in the nation, a supplier of vast amounts of power whose presence in Tennessee attracted large industries to relocate near one of its dams or steam plants. This incentive contributed to important economic development in the state.

World War II and economic progress
World War II brought relief to Tennessee by employing ten percent of the state's populace (308,199 men and women) in the armed services. Most of those who remained on farms and in cities worked on war-related production since Tennessee received war orders amounting to $1.25 billion.

Tennessee military personnel served with distinction from Pearl Harbor to the final, bloody assaults at Iwo Jima and Okinawa, and 7,000 died in combat during the war. In 1942–43, Middle Tennessee residents played host to 28 Army divisions that swarmed over the countryside on maneuvers preparing for the D-Day invasion.

Tennesseans participated in all phases of the war—from combat to civilian administration to military research. Cordell Hull served twelve years as Franklin D. Roosevelt's Secretary of State and became one of the chief architects of the United Nations, for which he received the Nobel Peace Prize.

Industrial expansion
War-based industries hummed with the labor of a greatly enlarged workforce. A giant shell-loading plant was built at Milan, as well as the Vultee Aircraft works in Nashville; TVA projects also expanded in East Tennessee. Approximately 33% of the state's workers were female by the end of the war.

Especially significant for the war effort was Tennessee's role in the Manhattan Project, the military's top secret project to build an atomic weapon. Research and production work for the first A-bombs were conducted at the huge scientific/industrial installation at Oak Ridge, Tennessee. The Oak Ridge community was entirely a creation of the war. It grew from empty woods in 1941 to a city of 70,000 (Tennessee's fifth largest) four years later.

With increased industrialization of the state's economy, the labor movement in the state would also gain momentum. In 1950, workers at an American Enka Company factory near the city of Morristown would strike. Tensions soon built when residents appeared at the factory gates to apply for advertised replacements of the striking workers. Violence then followed, with people killed and vandalism and destruction of cars and houses. Then Governor Gordon Browning, dispatched National Guard troops to restore order at the facility. By the end of the strike, the event had become the location of on-site congressional hearings and the nationwide face regarding labor relations.

Changes to poll tax disenfranchisement
Disenfranchising legislation of the late 19th century had affected poor whites as well as blacks. Despite vows to overturn them, "successive legislatures expanded the reach of the disenfranchising laws until they covered the state... County officers regulated the vote by providing opportunities to pay the tax (as they did in Knoxville), or conversely by making payment as difficult as possible. Such manipulation of the tax, and therefore the vote, created an opportunity for the rise of urban bosses and political machines. Urban politicians bought large blocks of poll tax receipts and distributed them to blacks and whites, who then voted as instructed."

Abuses of the poll tax continued to resist efforts by reformers for change in the 1930s and 1940s. In 1943 legislators managed to rescind the poll tax, but the Tennessee Supreme Court declared that action unconstitutional. It was not until 1953 that a new constitutional convention finally removed provisions for the poll tax. Hundreds of thousands of citizens, both black and white, had been disenfranchised by its abuses during the decades since its passage.

Civil Rights Movement
Tennessee played an important and prominent role during the Civil Rights Movement. Many national civil rights leaders, such as Martin Luther King Jr., received training in methods of nonviolent protest at the Highlander Folk School in Monteagle, Tennessee. The same nonviolent methods which Mahatma Gandhi had used were taught here.

In the spring of 1960, after decades of segregation, Tennessee's Jim Crow laws were challenged by an organized group of Nashville college students from Fisk University, American Baptist Theological Seminary, and Vanderbilt University. The students, led by Jim Farmer, John Lewis, and ministers of local African-American churches, used methods of non-violent protest in anticipation of a planned and concerted effort to desegregate Nashville's downtown lunch counters through a series of sit-ins. Although many were harassed and beaten by vigilantes and arrested by the Nashville police, none of the students retaliated with violence.

The Nashville sit-ins reached a turning point when the house of Z. Alexander Looby, a prominent African-American attorney and leader, was bombed. Although no one was killed, thousands of protesters spontaneously marched to Nashville City Hall to confront Mayor Ben West. Meeting the mass of protesters outside city hall, West informally debated with them and concluded by conceding that segregation was immoral. The bombing, the march, and Mayor West's statement helped convince downtown lunch counters to desegregate. Although segregation and Jim Crow were by no means over, the episode served as one of the first successful events of mostly nonviolent protest.

The community leadership and activism of African Americans in the Civil Rights Movement across the South gained passage of the national Civil Rights Act of 1964 and the Voting Rights Act of 1965. African Americans gained more civil rights and the power to exercise their voting rights. Voting rights for all races were protected by provisions of the Voting Rights Act.

Martin Luther King Jr. assassination
In contrast to the successes of the movement in Tennessee, the 1968 assassination of Martin Luther King Jr., in Memphis was perceived as symbolic of hatred in the state. King was in the city to support a strike by black sanitary public works employees of AFSCME Local 1733. The city quickly settled the strike on favorable terms to the employees. Riots and civil unrest erupted in African-American areas in numerous cities across the country, resulting in widespread injuries and millions of dollars in property damages.

Latter half of 20th century
In 1953, voters approved eight amendments to the state constitution, which extended the governor's term from two to four years, prohibiting two successive terms, and outlawed the poll tax.

In the years following World War II, Tennessee's economy continued to industrialize, and demand for energy grew faster than ever before. TVA built additional dams and coal-fired power plants in the state during the postwar years.

By the 1960s and onward, the state experienced economic growth due to the construction of the Interstate Highway System. Most of the state's interstates were completed by the mid-1970s. The construction of Interstate 40 through Memphis became a national talking point on the issue of eminent domain and grassroots lobbying, when the Tennessee Department of Transportation (TDOT) attempted to acquire Overton Park from the city of Memphis for the highway's right-of-way. A local activist group spent many years contesting the project and filed a series of lawsuits to stop the construction through the park. The case made its way to the U.S. Supreme Court in the 1971 landmark case Citizens to Preserve Overton Park v. Volpe. The court sided in favor of the activist group, and established the framework for judicial review of government agencies.

In 1977, a state constitutional convention was held that recommended 13 amendments to the state's constitution, 12 of which votes approved the next year. The changes allowed governors to serve two consecutive terms, required the General Assembly to balance the state's annual budget, reformed county legislative bodies, and removed provisions that had been invalidated by federal legislation and court cases during the Civil Rights Movement.

TVA's construction of the Tellico Dam in Loudon County became the subject of national controversy in the 1970s when the endangered snail darter fish was reported to be affected by the project. After lawsuits by environmental groups, the debate was decided by the U.S. Supreme Court case Tennessee Valley Authority v. Hill in 1978, leading to amendments of the Endangered Species Act that same year.

The 1982 World's Fair was held in Knoxville. Also known as the Knoxville International Energy Exposition, the fair's theme was "Energy Turns the World". The exposition was one of the most successful, and the last world's fair to be held in the United States as of 2021. In 1986, Tennessee held a yearlong celebration of the state's heritage and culture called "Homecoming '86". As part of the celebration, citizens of individual communities throughout the state researched their history, set future goals, conducted projects to preserve, promote, or enhance the quality of their respective communities, and organized other celebratory events.

1996 Bicentennial
Tennessee celebrated its bicentennial in 1996 after a yearlong statewide celebration entitled "Tennessee 200" by opening a new state park—the Bicentennial Mall—at the foot of Capitol Hill in Nashville.

21st century
In 2002, Phil Bredesen became the 48th governor, and Tennessee amended the state constitution to allow for the establishment of a lottery. In 2006, Tennessee saw the only freshman Republican, Bob Corker, elected to the United States Senate in the midst of the 2006 midterm elections and the Constitution was amended to reject same-sex marriage. In January 2007, Ron Ramsey became the first Republican to become Speaker of the State Senate since Reconstruction. In 2010, during the historic 2010 midterm elections, Bill Haslam succeeded Bredesen, who was term-limited, to become the 49th Governor of Tennessee.

In April and May 2010, flooding in Middle Tennessee devastated Nashville and other parts of Middle Tennessee. In April 2011, parts of East Tennessee, including Hamilton and Bradley counties, were devastated by the 2011 Super Outbreak, the largest and costliest tornado outbreak in history.

See also

 African Americans in Tennessee
 History of the Southern United States
 Timeline of Tennessee
Cities in Tennessee
 Timeline of Chattanooga, Tennessee
 Timeline of Knoxville, Tennessee
 Timeline of Memphis, Tennessee
 Timeline of Nashville, Tennessee

References

Citations

Bibliography

Further reading

Surveys
Van West, Carroll. The Tennessee Encyclopedia of History and Culture (Tennessee Historical Society, 2002)
 Bergeron, Paul H.  Paths of the Past: Tennessee, 1770-1970 (1979), Short survey
 Brown, Theodore. A History of the Tennessee Supreme Court (U of Tennessee Press, 2002).
Carpenter, William. History of Tennessee: From its earliest settlement to the present (2011)
 Folmsbee, Stanley John, Robert Ewing Corlew, and Enoch L. Mitchell. Tennessee: A Short History (University of Tennessee Press, 1969).
 Folmsbee, Stanley John. History of Tennessee (4 vol Lewis Historical Publishing Company, 1960), Two volumes of text 2 of biographies
 Laska, Lewis L. "Legal and Constitutional History of Tennessee, 1772-1972, A." University of Memphis Law Review 6 (1975): 563.
 Lamon, Lester C. Blacks in Tennessee, 1791–1970. University of Tennessee Press, 1980.
 Mansfield, Stephen, and George E Grant. Faithful Volunteers: The History of Religion in Tennessee (1997)
 Norton, Herman. Religion in Tennessee, 1777–1945. University of Tennessee Press, 1981.
 Sawyer, Susan. More Than Petticoats: Remarkable Tennessee Women (2nd ed. 2014) 
Van West, Carroll. Tennessee History: The Land, The People, and the Culture University of Tennessee Press, 1998.

To 1860
 Abernethy, Thomas Perkins. From Frontier to Plantation  in Tennessee: A Study in Frontier Democracy (1932) online
 Arnow, Harriette Simpson. Seedtime on the Cumberland (1960)
 Arnow, Harriette Simpson. Flowering on the Cumberland (1963).
  Atkins, Jonathan. Parties, Politics and the Sectional Conflict in Tennessee, 1832-1861 (1997)
 Bergeron, Paul H. Antebellum Politics in Tennessee. (1982).
 Finger, John R. Tennessee Frontiers: Three Regions in Transition(Indiana UP, 2001).
 Holladay, Robert. "Antebellum Tennessee historiography: a critical appraisal," Tennessee Historical Quarterly (2010) 69#3 pp 224–241. online
 Kristofer Ray.  published his Middle Tennessee, 1775-1825: Progress and Popular Democracy on the Southwestern Frontier (2007)
  Morris, Christopher. Becoming Southern:  The Evolution of a Way of Life, Warren County  and Vicksburg, Mississippi, 1770-1860 (1995). 
 Ratner, Lorman A.  Andrew Jackson and  His Tennessee Lieutenants: A Study in Political Culture (2001)
 Roosevelt, Theodore. The Winning of the West (4 vol 1888), pre 1800

Civil War

 Ash. Steven V. Middle Tennessee Transformed, 1860–1870. Louisiana State University Press, 1988.
 Connelly, Thomas L. Civil War Tennessee: Battles and Leaders. Knoxville: The University of Tennessee Press, 1979. .
 Groce, W. Todd. Mountain Rebels: East Tennessee Confederates and the Civil War. Knoxville, Tennessee: University of Tennessee Press. .
 Humes, Thomas W. The Loyal Mountaineers of Tennessee. Knoxville, Tennessee: Ogden Brothers and Company, 1888.
 Lepa, Jack H. The Civil War in Tennessee, 1862–1863. Jefferson, North Carolina: McFarland & Company, 2007.
 Maslowski Peter. Treason Must Be Made Odious: Military Occupation and Wartime Reconstruction in Nashville, Tennessee, 1862-65. 1978.
 Patton, James W. Unionism and Reconstruction in Tennessee, 1860-1867. Chapel Hill, North Carolina University of North Carolina Press, 1934.
 Seymour, Digby Gordon and David Richer. Divided Loyalties: Fort Sanders and the Civil War in East Tennessee. East Tennessee Historical Society, 1982.
 Sheeler, J. Reuben. "Secession and The Unionist Revolt," Journal of Negro History, Vol. 29, No. 2 (Apr., 1944), pp. 175–185 in JSTOR, covers east Tennessee
 Temple, Oliver. East Tennessee and the Civil War. Cincinnati, Ohio: The R. Clarke Company, 1899.

Reconstruction
 Alexander, Thomas B.  Political Reconstruction in Tennessee (1950)
 Alexander, Thomas B.  "Political Reconstruction in Tennessee, 1865-1870,'" in Richard O. Curry, ed., Radicalism, Racism, and Party Realignment: The Border States during Reconstruction (Johns Hopkins UP, 1969) pp 37–79; an abridged version of Alexander's 1950 book.
 Alexander, Thomas B. "Kukluxism in Tennessee, 1865-1869." Tennessee Historical Quarterly (1949): 195-219. in JSTOR
 Cimprich, John. Slavery's End in Tennessee (U of Alabama Press, 2002).
 Cimprich, John. "The Beginning of the Black Suffrage Movement in Tennessee, 1864-65." Journal of Negro History 65.3 (1980): 185-195. in JSTOR
 Coulter, E. Merton. William G. Brownlow: Fighting Parson of the Southern Highlands (1937) online
 Fisher, Noel C. War at Every Door: Partisan Politics and Guerrilla Violence in East Tennessee, 1860-1869 (U of North Carolina Press, 2001).
 Groce, W. Todd. Mountain Rebels: East Tennessee Confederates and the Civil War, 1860-1870 (U of Tennessee Press, 2000).
 Harcourt, Edward John. "Who were the pale faces? New perspectives on the Tennessee Ku Klux." Civil War History 51.1 (2005): 23-66. online
 Hooper, Ernest Walter. Memphis, Tennessee, Federal occupation and reconstruction, 1862-1870. (U of North Carolina, 1957).
 McKinney, Gordon B. Southern Mountain Republicans, 1865-1900: Politics and the Appalachian Community (U of Tennessee Press, 1998).
 Maslowski, Peter. Treason must be made odious: military occupation and wartime reconstruction in Nashville, Tennessee, 1862-65. (Kto Press, 1978).
 Maslowski, Peter. "From Reconciliation to Reconstruction: Lincoln, Johnson, and Tennessee, Part II." Tennessee Historical Quarterly 42.4 (1983): 343-361. in JSTOR
 Miscamble, Wilson D. "Andrew Johnson and the Election of William G.(" Parson") Brownlow As Governor or Tennessee." Tennessee Historical Quarterly 37.3 (1978): 308-320. in JSTOR
 Patton; James Welch. Unionism and Reconstruction in Tennessee, 1860–1869 (1934) online edition
 Phillips, Paul David. "White Reaction to the Freedmen's Bureau in Tennessee." Tennessee Historical Quarterly 25.1 (1966): 50-62. in JSTOR
 Taylor, Alrutheus A. Negro in Tennessee 1865–1880 (1974) 

Since 1876
 Bucy, Carole Stanford. "Tennessee in the Twentieth Century." Tennessee Historical Quarterly 69.3 (2010): 262-273. in JSTOR; including prohibition, religion, politics, music, military, race, and gender.
 Conkin, Paul K. "Evangelicals, Fugitives, and Hillbillies: Tennessee's Impact on American National Culture." Tennessee Historical Quarterly 54.3 (1995): 246.
 Cotham, Perry C. Toil, turmoil, and triumph: A portrait of the Tennessee labor movement (Providence House Publishers, 1995).
 Grantham, Dewey W. "Tennessee and Twentieth-Century American Politics." Tennessee Historical Quarterly 54.3 (1995): 210+
 Greene, Lee S. Lead Me On: Frank Goad Clement and Tennessee Politics (U of Tennessee Press, 1982); The Democrat was governor in the 1950s and 1960s.
 Isaac, Paul E. Prohibition and politics: Turbulent decades in Tennessee, 1885-1920 (1965).
 Israel, Charles. Before Scopes: Evangelicalism, Education, and Evolution in Tennessee, 1870-1925 (2004).
 Majors, William R. Change and Continuity: Tennessee Politics Since the Civil War (Mercer University Press, 1986).
 Nelson, Michael, "Tennessee: Once a Bluish State, Now a Reddish One," Tennessee Historical Quarterly, 65 (Summer 2006), 162–83. Heavily illustrated, recent politics.
 Parks, Norman L. "Tennessee Politics Since Kefauver and Reece: A  'Generalist' View." Journal of Politics 28.01 (1966): 144-168.
 Rutledge, David William. "Fall from Grace? The Breakup of the Democratic Party and the Rise of Republicanism in Tennessee, 1948-1970". (Thesis Vanderbilt University. Dept. of History, 2008) online.
 Wheeler, Marjorie Spruill, ed. Votes for Women! The Woman Suffrage Movement in Tennessee, the South and the Nation (U of Tennessee Press, 1995), 358 pp. online review

Race relations
 Bates, Jason L., "Consolidating Support for a Law 'Incapable of Enforcement': Segregation on Tennessee Streetcars, 1900–1930," Journal of Southern History, 82 (Feb. 2016), 97–126. excerpt
Bontemps, Arna. William C. Handy: Father of the Blues: An Autobiography. Macmillan Company: New York, 1941.
Cartwright, Joseph H. The Triumph of Jim Crow: Tennessee's Race Relations in the 1880s. University of Tennessee Press, 1976.
 Cumfer, Cynthia. Separate  Peoples, One Land: The Minds of Cherokees, Blacks  and Whites on the Tennessee Frontier (Chapel Hill,  2007). online
Honey, Michael K. Southern Labor and Black Civil Rights: Organizing Memphis Workers. University of Illinois Press, 1993.
 Kyriakoudes, Louis M. The Social Origins of the Urban South: Race, Gender, and Migration in Nashville and Middle Tennessee, 1890-1930 (2003). 
 Lamon, Lester C. Blacks in Tennessee, 1791–1970. (U of Tennessee Press, 1980).
 Van West,  Carroll, ed. Trial and  Triumph: Essays in Tennessee's African-American  History (2002)

Historiography
 Bucy, Carole Stanford. "Tennessee in the Twentieth Century." Tennessee Historical Quarterly 69#3 (2010), pp. 262–273. online
 Clark, Vincent L. "Editor's Note: The State Of Local History." West Tennessee Historical Society Papers (2012), Vol. 66, p1-7. Focus on internet resources.
 Holladay, Robert. "Antebellum Tennessee Historiography: A Critical Appraisal." Tennessee Historical Quarterly 69#3 (2010), pp 224–241   online
 Ray, Kristofer. "New Directions in Early Tennessee History, 1540―1815." Tennessee Historical Quarterly 69#3 (2010) pp. 204–223.  online
 Rhodes, Miranda Fraley. " 'For Weal or Woe' Tennessee History from the Civil War to the Early Twentieth Century." Tennessee Historical Quarterly'' 69.3 (2010): 242-261. Online

External links
 Tennessee Historical Society
 East Tennessee Historical Society
 West Tennessee Historical Society
 Smoky Mountain Historical Society
 Boston Public Library, Map Center. Maps of Tennessee, various dates.

 
Tennessee
Tennessee